Governor Grover was a sternwheel steamboat that ran on the Willamette River during the 1870s.  Because of the completion of the Willamette Locks in late 1872, it was possible for vessels such as Governor Grover to be built in Portland, Oregon and then readily navigate the Willamette above Willamette Falls.

Construction 
Governor Grover was built in 1873 for the Willamette River Navigation Company which had been formed to compete with the monopoly on the river that was then held by the People's Transportation Company, which by 1873 had come under the control of steamboat and stagecoach magnate Ben Holladay.  Among the backers of the Willamette River Navigation Company were the important businessman Bernard Goldsmith and the steamboat men Jacob Kamm and Joseph Kellogg, with the latter supervising construction of the Grover.  Grover was named after La Fayette Grover (1823-1911) fourth governor of the state of Oregon (1870-1877).  Other vessels built by the Willamette River Navigation Company included the sternwheelers Vancouver (1870), Beaver (1873), and Willamette Chief (1874).

Operation 
Grover was launched on January 28, 1873, and made her first trip on March 16, 1873.  Officers at first were Charles Holman, Captain, George Marshall, chief engineer, and A. Vickers and Charles Kellogg, pilots.
Shortly after construction Governor Grover passed into the ownership of the Willamette Falls Locks and Canal Company.  Governor Grover worked on the Willamette River and, on March 18, 1873, was the first large vessel to go as far upriver as Harrisburg.  Grover achieved some success in driving down rates, and became popular among the farmers of the Willamette Valley.

In 1874 Capt. Holman was succeeded in command by Capt. James Wilson, who remained with the vessel for several years.  The Willamette Falls Locks and Canal Company sold Grover to the Oregon Steam Navigation Company, which worked the vessel on all routes running out of Portland, Oregon.

Disposition 
In 1880, Governor Grover was dismantled at Portland, Oregon.

Notes

References 
 Affleck, Edward L., A Century of Paddlewheelers in the Pacific Northwest, the Yukon, and Alaska, Alexander Nicolls Press, Vancouver, BC 2000 
 Corning, Howard McKinley, Willamette Landings—Ghost Towns of the River, Oregon Historical Society, Portland, Oregon (2nd Ed. 1973) 
 Mills, Randall V., Sternwheelers up the Columbia—A Century of Steamboating in the Oregon Country, University of Nebraska, Lincoln, NE (1977 reprint of 1947 edition) 
 Wright, E.W., ed., Lewis & Dryden 's Marine History of the Northwest, Lewis & Dryden Printing Co., Portland, OR 1895, available on-line at the Washington Secretary of State Historical Section

Further reading

 Faber, Jim, Steamer's Wake—Voyaging down the old marine highways of Puget Sound, British Columbia, and the Columbia River, Enetai Press, Seattle, WA 1985 
 Newell, Gordon R., and Williamson, Joe, Pacific Steamboats Bonanza Press, New York, NY 1958
 Timmen, Fritz, Blow for the Landing—A Hundred Years of Steam Navigation on the Waters of the West, Caxton Press, Caldwell, ID 1973 

Steamboats of Oregon
Steamboats of the Willamette River
Steamboats of the Columbia River
Passenger ships of the United States
Merchant ships of the United States
1873 ships
Oregon Steam Navigation Company
Oregon Railroad and Navigation Company
Willamette River Transportation Company